The  is a Japanese,  narrow gauge industrial railway line in Toyama Prefecture, operated by Kansai Electric Power Company. The two lines go to hydroelectric power plants of Kurobe River. These lines are basically not open to public. This article is mainly about Jōbu Track.

Overview

Jōbu Track runs from Keyakidaira-Jōbu to Kurobegawa No.4 Power Station-mae, and is a part of Kurobe Route, an industrial transportation route between Keyakidaira and Kurobe dam. From Keyakidaira, Kurobe Gorge Railway Main Line runs to Unazuki neighbouring Unazukionsen of Toyama Chihō Railway Main Line. As a counterpart the tunnels are divided into 42 parts by the Jōbu Track (literally meaning "Upper Track"), Kurobe Gorge Railway Main Line is sometimes called .

The section between Keyakidaira and Sennindani was built in 1941 for the construction of Kurobegawa No.3 Power Station. The section between Sennindani and Kurobegawa No.4 Power Station-mae was built in 1963, for the construction of the said power station.

The construction of the section called  is known for its difficulties.

Basic data
This is the data of Jōbu Track.
Distance: 6.4 km
Gauge: 
Stations: 6
Track: Single
Power: Battery

Stations
Those in italics are not treated as "stations", but are merely depots. All stations are located in Kurobe, Toyama, except of Kurobegawa No.4 Power Station-mae, which is located in Tateyama, Toyama.

: Altitude 800 m. Linked to Keyakidaira-Kabu (altitude 599m) by an elevator. Keyakidaira-Kabu is virtually the same station as Keyakidaira, Kurobe Gorge Railway Main Line.

: Altitude . Linked to Incline-Jōbu (altitude 1325m) by a funicular.

Services

A battery locomotive tows small freight/passenger cabs, a few times a day. Battery locomotives are used because the High Temperature Tunnel may flash off the fuels of engines. Unlike Kurobe Gorge Railway which closes during winter, Jōbu Track operates whole year. This is because the line is almost entirely under a tunnel, so it is not affected by heavy snow.

The actual operation is done by Kurobe Gorge Railway Company, a wholly owned subsidiary of Kansai Electric Power Company.

The elevator was made in 1939 by Otis Elevator Company. It is the elevator with the largest maximum loading capacity in Japan, . Kurobe Senyō Railway (Jōbu Track) begins from Keyakidaira-Jōbu Station, to Kurobegawa No.4 Power Station-mae Station.

Kurobe Route, including the Jōbu Track, is basically not open to public. However, from 1996, participants of a study tour are allowed to take the route. Visitors have to book in advance. In most cases, there are more applicants than the limit, so they have to win a lottery to join the tour. In 2007, they had 34 tours with 2040 participants in total. For each tour, applicants were 2 to 8 times more than the limit.

Kuronagi Branch Line
The line has very infrequent services. As such, tourists going to the nearby  can walk on the line track (tunnel) with permission by a Kuronagi Station attendant. Unlike the Jōbu Track, the line is not entirely under a tunnel.

See also
Tateyama Sabō Erosion Control Works Service Train
Kurobe Gorge Railway
Kanden Tunnel Trolleybus
Kurobe dam
Tateyama Kurobe Alpine Route
Industrial railway

External links

 Kansai Electric Power Company official website, explaining the study tour 
 Toyama Prefecture official website, explaining the study tour 

Railway lines in Japan
Rail transport in Toyama Prefecture
2 ft 6 in gauge railways in Japan
Railway lines opened in 1941
Tateyama, Toyama